Masha Mapenzi (born in Watamu, Kenya) is an African Gospel and Afro-fusion singer.

Mapenzi performs in styles such as chakacha, taarab, bango and afrobeat. She was the winner on the first season of Pop Idol in Kenya, performing her own rendition of the famous hymn "When Peace, Like a River".

Mapenzi's first album is titled Uhiko (available as an iTunes download), and includes the single "Nainua Macho Yangu" as well as the tracks "Uhiko", "Mahabubu" and "Tamu Tamu".

The Song "Uhiko" won Çoast Awards - Diaspora Artist of the year 2010 and Coast Awards - Runner up Female Artist of the Year 2010.

External links

Living people
21st-century Kenyan women singers
Year of birth missing (living people)
Gospel singers
People from Coast Province
Kenyan gospel musicians